Cherry is the fourth studio album by Shit and Shine, released on 28 January 2008 by Riot Season.

Track listing

Personnel
Adapted from the Cherry liner notes.
Shit and Shine
 Craig Clouse – vocals, instruments, recording, cover art
Production and additional personnel
 Mathieu Berthet – mastering
 Harvey Birrell – recording
 Cake – recording
 Gadget – recording

Release history

References

External links 
 
 Cherry at Bandcamp

2008 albums
Shit and Shine albums